Tseax may refer to:

Tseax Cone, a volcano in northern British Columbia, Canada
Tseax River, a river in northern British Columbia, Canada